In computing, format, a command-line utility that carries out disk formatting. It is a component of various operating systems, including 86-DOS, MS-DOS, IBM PC DOS and OS/2, Microsoft Windows and ReactOS.

Overview
The command performs the following actions by default on a floppy disk, hard disk drive, solid state (USB), or other magnetic medium (it will not perform these actions on optical media):

 clearing the FAT entries by changing them to 
 clearing the FAT root directory by changing any values found to 
 checking each cluster to see if it is good or bad and marking it as good or bad in the FAT

Any storage device must have its medium structured to be useful.  This process is referred to as "creating a filesystem" in Unix, Linux, or BSD.  Under these systems different commands are used.  The commands can create many kinds of file systems, including those used by DOS, Windows, and OS/2.

Implementations

The command is also available in Intel ISIS-II, iRMX 86, MetaComCo TRIPOS, AmigaDOS, Zilog Z80-RIO, Microware OS-9, DR FlexOS, TSL PC-MOS, SpartaDOS X, Datalight ROM-DOS, IBM/Toshiba 4690 OS, PTS-DOS, SISNE plus, and in the DEC RT-11 operating system.

Microsoft DOS and Windows
On MS-DOS, the command is available in versions 1 and later.

Optionally (by adding the /S, for "system" switch), format can also install a Volume Boot Record.  With this option, Format writes bootstrap code to the first sector of the volume (and possibly elsewhere as well).  Format always writes a BIOS Parameter Block to the first sector, with or without the /S option.

Another option (/Q) allows for what Microsoft calls "Quick Format".  With this option the command will not perform steps 2 and 3 above. Format /Q does not alter data previously written to the media.

Typing "format" with no parameters in MS-DOS 3.2 or earlier would automatically, without prompting the user, format the current drive; however in MS-DOS 3.3 and later it would simply produce the error: "required parameter missing".

DR/Novell DOS
DR DOS 6.0 includes an implementation of the  command.

FreeDOS
The FreeDOS version was developed by Brian E. Reifsnyder and is licensed under the GPL.

ReactOS

The ReactOS implementation is based on a free clone developed by Mark Russinovich for Sysinternals in 1998. It is licensed under the GPL.
It was adapted to ReactOS by Emanuele Aliberti in 1999 and supports FAT, FAT32, FATX, EXT2, and BtrFS filesystems.

See also
Disk formatting
Data recovery
convert
File Allocation Table
Design of the FAT file system
fdisk
PC DOS 7.10 Format32

Notes

References

Further reading

External links

Microsoft Windows XP Professional Product Documentation: "format"
Open source FORMAT implementation that comes with MS-DOS v2.0
MSKB255867: How to Use the Fdisk Tool and the Format Tool to Partition or Repartition a Hard Disk
Microsoft DOS format command
Recovery Console format command

External DOS commands
Hard disk software
Microsoft free software
MSX-DOS commands
OS/2 commands
Windows commands